The Young Indiana Jones Chronicles is an American television series that aired on ABC from March 4, 1992, to July 24, 1993. Filming took place in various locations around the world, with "Old Indy" bookend segments filmed in Wilmington, North Carolina and on the campus of the University of North Carolina at Wilmington. The series was a Lucasfilm production in association with Amblin Television and Paramount Network Television.

The series explores the childhood and youth of the fictional character Indiana Jones and primarily stars Sean Patrick Flanery and Corey Carrier as the title character, with George Hall playing an elderly version of Jones for the bookends of most episodes, though Harrison Ford bookended one episode. The show was created and executive produced by George Lucas, who also created, co-wrote, and executive produced the Indiana Jones feature films.

Due to its large budget and low viewership ratings, the series was canceled in 1993. However, following the series' cancellation, four made-for-television films were produced from 1994 to 1996 in an attempt to continue the series. In 1999, the series was re-edited into 22 television films under the title The Adventures of Young Indiana Jones.

Overview

The series was designed as an educational program for children and teenagers, spotlighting historical figures and important events. Most episodes feature a standard formula of an elderly (93-year-old) Indiana Jones (played by George Hall) in present-day (1993) New York City encountering people who spur him to reminisce and tell stories about his past adventures. These stories would either involve him as a young boy (8 to 10, played by Corey Carrier) or as a teenager (16 to 21, played by Sean Patrick Flanery). The younger Indy would travel to different parts of the world with his parents and tutor. The older, teenaged Indy rebels against his father by joining the Belgian army. Using a fake name he fights both at Verdun and in Africa. He later becomes a spy. In one episode, a fifty-year-old Indy (played by Harrison Ford) is seen reminiscing. Initially, the plan was for the series to alternate between the adventures of Indy as a child (Corey Carrier) and as a teenager (Sean Patrick Flanery), but eventually the episodes featuring Flanery's version of the character dominated the series. The series' bookends revealed that the elderly Jones has a daughter, grandchildren, and great-grandchildren. There is no mention of a son, but in 2008, the film Kingdom of the Crystal Skull introduces Mutt Williams as his son with Marion Ravenwood.

Many of the episodes involve Indiana meeting and working with famous historical figures. Historical figures featured on the show include Leo Tolstoy, Howard Carter, Charles de Gaulle, and John Ford, in such diverse locations as Egypt, Austria-Hungary, India, China, and the whole of Europe. For example, Curse of the Jackal prominently involves Indy in the adventures of T. E. Lawrence and Pancho Villa. Indy also encounters (in no particular order) Edgar Degas, Giacomo Puccini, George Patton, Pablo Picasso (same episode as Degas), Eliot Ness, Charles Nungesser, Al Capone, Manfred von Richthofen, Anthony Fokker, Annie Besant, Charles Webster Leadbeater, Jiddu Krishnamurti, Paul von Lettow-Vorbeck, Norman Rockwell (same episode as Degas and Picasso), Louis Armstrong, George Gershwin, Seán O'Casey, Siegfried Sassoon, Patrick Pearse, Winston Churchill, a very young Ho Chi Minh, Carl Jung, Sigmund Freud, and Carl Laemmle; at one point, he competes against a young Ernest Hemingway for the affections of a girl but they end up becoming friends, is nursed back to health by Albert Schweitzer, has a passionate tryst with Mata Hari, discusses philosophy with Nikos Kazantzakis, and goes on a safari with Theodore Roosevelt.

The show provided back story for the films. His relationship with his father, first introduced in Last Crusade, was depicted in episodes showing his travels with his father as a young boy and brief times as a young adult. His original hunt for the "Eye of the Peacock", a large diamond seen in Temple of Doom, was a recurring element in several stories. The show also chronicled his activities during World War I and his first solo adventures. Later, in the 2008 film Kingdom of the Crystal Skull, Indy describes his adventures with Pancho Villa (chronicled in the first episode) to Mutt Williams (at the time, his sidekick; later on revealed to be his son).

Cast

Guest appearances
Most episodes of the series depicted famous and not-so-famous historical figures, including Theodore Roosevelt, T.E. Lawrence, Mustafa Kemal Atatürk, Norman Rockwell, Charles de Gaulle, Leo Tolstoy, Winston Churchill, Ernest Hemingway, Manfred von Richthofen, Paul von Lettow-Vorbeck, George Patton, Al Capone, Pablo Picasso, Frederick Selous, Princess Sophie of Hohenberg and Mata Hari.

Notable guest stars (playing either fictional or historical characters) include: Catherine Zeta-Jones, Daniel Craig, Christopher Lee, Clark Gregg, Tom Courtenay, Peter Firth, Vanessa Redgrave, Beata Pozniak, Jennifer Ehle, Elizabeth Hurley, Timothy Spall, Anne Heche, Paul Freeman, Jean-Pierre Castaldi, Jeffrey Wright, Jeroen Krabbé, Jason Flemyng, Michael Kitchen, Kevin McNally, Francisco Quinn, Ian McDiarmid, Max von Sydow, Douglas Henshall, Jon Pertwee, Sean Pertwee, Vincenzo Nicoli, Terry Jones, Keith David, Lukas Haas, Frank Vincent, Jay Underwood, Michael Gough, Maria Charles, Elsa Zylberstein, Isaach de Bankolé, Emil Abossolo-Mbo, Haluk Bilginer and Saginaw Grant.

Production

Development

During the production of the Indiana Jones feature films, the cast and crew frequently questioned  creator George Lucas about the Indiana Jones character's life growing up. During the concept stages of Indiana Jones and the Last Crusade, Lucas and director Steven Spielberg decided to reveal some of this backstory in the film's opening scenes. For these scenes, Lucas chose River Phoenix to portray the character, as Harrison Ford believed that Phoenix most resembled Ford as a young man. Phoenix had appeared as the son of Ford's character in The Mosquito Coast. This decision to reveal an adventure of a young Indiana led Lucas and crew to the idea of creating the series.

Writing
Lucas wrote an extensive time-line detailing the life of Indiana Jones, assembling the elements for about 70 episodes, starting in 1905 and leading all the way up to the feature films. Each outline included the place, date and the historical persons Indy would meet in that episode, and would then be turned over to one of the series writers. When the series came to an end about 31 of the 70 stories had been filmed. Had the series been renewed for a third season, Young Indy would have been introduced to younger versions of characters from Raiders of the Lost Ark: Abner Ravenwood ("Jerusalem, June 1909") and René Belloq ("Honduras, December 1920"). Other episodes would have filled in the blanks between existing ones ("Le Havre, June 1916", "Berlin, Late August, 1916"), and there would even have been some adventures starring a five-year-old Indy (including "Princeton, May 1905").

During production of the series, Lucas became interested in the crystal skulls. He originally called for an episode which would have been part of the third season involving Jones and his friend Belloq searching for one of the skulls. The episode was never produced, and the idea ultimately evolved into the 2008 feature film Indiana Jones and the Kingdom of the Crystal Skull.

Casting
A number of actors connected to the Indiana Jones films and/or George Lucas's Star Wars franchise made guest appearances. Harrison Ford appeared as a middle-aged Indy (age 50) in the episode "Young Indiana Jones and the Mystery of the Blues", which aired in March 1993. Paul Freeman, who played Rene Belloq in Raiders of the Lost Ark, portrayed Frederick Selous in a couple of episodes, while Roshan Seth, who played Chattar Lal in Indiana Jones and the Temple of Doom, played a North African sheikh in "Morocco, 1917" (later re-edited into "Tales of Innocence"). The late William Hootkins (Major Eaton from Raiders of the Lost Ark and Porkins from Star Wars) played Russian ballet producer Sergei Diaghilev and Wolf Kahler (Colonel Dietrich in Raiders of the Lost Ark) played a German diplomat in "Barcelona, May 1917". In the episode Attack of the Hawkmen, Star Wars veteran Anthony Daniels played François, a French Intelligence scientist (in the mode of James Bond's "Q") who gives Indy a special suitcase filled with gadgets for a special mission in Germany. Clint Eastwood was approached to play the elder brother of Indiana Jones, but he turned it down despite a $10 million offer.

Filming

A variety of filmmakers wrote or directed many episodes of the series, including Frank Darabont, Nicolas Roeg, Mike Newell, Deepa Mehta, Joe Johnston, Jonathan Hensleigh, Terry Jones, Simon Wincer, Carrie Fisher, Dick Maas and Vic Armstrong. Lucas was given a "Story By" credit in many episodes, along with his input as a creative consultant.

The series was unusual in that it was shot on location around the world. Partly to offset the cost of this, the series was shot on 16mm film, rather than 35. The series was designed so that each pair of episodes could either be broadcast separately, or as a 2-hour film-length episode. Each episode cost about $1.5 million and the filming with Young Indy usually took around 3 weeks. The first production filming alternated between "Sean" and "Corey" episodes. The segments with old Indy were referred to as "bookends." Filming a pair of them typically took a day and most were shot at Carolco Studios in Wilmington, North Carolina and on location in Wilmington. The show also featured footage from other films spliced into several episodes.

The series was shot in three stages. The first production occurred from 1991 to 1992, and consisted of sixteen episodes; five with younger Indy, ten with older Indy, and one with both—for a total of seventeen television hours. The second production occurred from 1992 to 1993 and consisted of twelve episodes; one with younger Indy and eleven with older Indy, for a total of fifteen television hours. The third and final production occurred from 1994 to 1995, and consisted of four made-for-television movies, for a total of eight television hours. In 1996, additional filming was done in order to re-edit the entire series into twenty-two feature films.

Soundtrack
The series' main theme was composed by Laurence Rosenthal, who wrote much of the music for the series. Joel McNeely also wrote music for many episodes; he received an Emmy in 1993 for the Episode "Scandal of 1920". French composer Frédéric Talgorn composed some music for the episode set in World War I France ("The Somme, July 1916/Germany, August 1916"). Music for "Transylvania, September 1918" was composed by Curt Sobel.

Broadcast history

Television

The pilot episode was aired by ABC in the United States in March 1992. The pilot, the feature-length Young Indiana Jones and the Curse of the Jackal, was later re-edited as two separate episodes, "Egypt, May 1908" and "Mexico, March 1916." Eleven further hour-long episodes were aired in 1992 (seven in the first season, four were part of the second season) - during the second season, it was placed as the lead-in to Monday Night Football, just as fellow Paramount series MacGyver had done for the previous six years. Only 16 of the remaining 20 episodes were aired in 1993 when ABC canceled the show. The Family Channel later produced four two-hour TV movies that were broadcast from 1994 to 1996. Though Lucas intended to produce episodes leading up to a 24-year-old Jones, the series was cancelled with the character at age 21.

Home media
The revised and updated edition of the book George Lucas: The Creative Impulse, by Charles Champlin, explains how The Young Indiana Jones Chronicles series would be re-edited into the new structure of twenty-two Chapter TV films, for the 1999 VHS release. New footage was shot in 1996 to be incorporated with the newly re-edited and re-titled "chapters" to better help it chronologically and provide smooth transitions. The newly shot Tangiers, 1908 was joined with Egypt, 1908 from the Curse of the Jackal to form My First Adventure, and Morocco, 1917 was joined with Northern Italy, 1918 (now re-dated as 1917) to form Tales of Innocence. Also included in the home video release were four unaired episodes made for the ABC network: Florence, May 1908; Prague, 1917; Transylvania, 1918; and Palestine, 1917. The series itself was also re-titled as The Adventures of Young Indiana Jones.

The 93-year-old Indy bookends for the original series were removed, as well as Sean Patrick Flanery's bookend for "Travels With Father"; however, the Harrison Ford bookend, set in 1950, from "Mystery of The Blues" was not cut.

VHS and Laserdisc
The series received its first home video release on April 21, 1993, when a Laserdisc box set was released in Japan containing fifteen of the earlier episodes and a short documentary on the making of the series. The discs were formatted in NTSC and presented with English audio in Dolby surround with Japanese subtitles. In 1994, eight NTSC format VHS tapes with a total of fifteen episodes from the first two seasons were released in Japan.

On October 26, 1999, half of the series was released on VHS in the United States for $14.99 each, along with a box set of the feature films. The series was labeled as Chapters 1–22, while the feature films were labeled as Chapters 23–25. In an effort to promote the series, the episode "Treasure of the Peacock's Eye" was included with the purchase of the movie trilogy box set in the US. The episode was chosen for the fact that its plot continues into the opening of Indiana Jones and the Temple of Doom, which was labeled as the first film chronologically in the film trilogy.

In other countries different chapters were included, for example in the UK The Phantom Train of Doom was included. The twelve VHS releases were released worldwide over the course of 2000, including the UK, Netherlands, Hungary, Germany, Mexico, France and Japan. The UK, German, French, Hungarian and Netherlands tapes were in PAL format, while the tapes released in the rest of the countries were in NTSC format.

DVD
In 2002, series producer Rick McCallum confirmed in an interview with Variety that DVDs of the series were in development, but would not be released for "about three or four years". At the October 2005 press conference for the Star Wars: Episode III – Revenge of the Sith DVD, McCallum explained that he expected the release to consist of 22 DVDs, which would include around 100 documentaries which would explore the real-life historical aspects that are fictionalized in the show. For the DVDs, Lucasfilm upgraded the picture quality of the original 16 mm prints and remastered the soundtracks. This, along with efforts to get best quality masters and bonus materials on the sets, delayed the release. It was ultimately decided that the release would tie into the release of the fourth Indiana Jones feature film.

Two variations of Volume 1 were released by CBS DVD, one simply as "Volume One", and the other as "Volume One — The Early Years" in order to match the subtitle of Volume 2.

The History Channel acquired television rights to all 94 of the DVD historical documentaries. The airing of the documentaries was meant to bring in ratings for the History Channel and serve as marketing for the DVD release and the theatrical release of Indiana Jones and the Kingdom of the Crystal Skull. The History Channel and History International began airing the series every Saturday morning at 7AM/6C on The History Channel, and every Sunday morning at 8AM ET/PT on History International. A new division of History.com was created devoted to the show. As Paramount and Lucasfilm had already reserved IndianaJones.com solely for news and updates related to Indiana Jones and the Kingdom of the Crystal Skull, StarWars.com temporarily served as the official site for the DVDs—providing regular updates, insider looks and promotions related to them. However, Lucasfilm and Paramount soon set up an official website proper for the series—YoungIndy.com. Paramount released a press kit for the media promoting the DVDs, which consists of a .pdf file and several videos with interviews with Lucas and McCallum, and footage from the DVDs. A trailer for the DVDs was also published on YoungIndy.com, with a shorter version being shown on The History Channel and History International.

Lucas and McCallum hope that the DVDs will be helpful to schools, as they believe the series is a good way to aid in teaching history. Lucas explained that the series' DVD release will be shopped as "films for a modern day high school history class." He believes the series is a good way to teach high school students 20th-century history. The plan was always to tie the DVD release of the series to the theatrical release of the fourth Indiana Jones feature film, Indiana Jones and the Kingdom of the Crystal Skull, which was released on May 22, 2008.

Companion historical documentaries
Ninety-four historical documentaries were created over a nearly five-year period by Lucasfilm's documentary crew for the DVD release of the series. Each documentary covers a historical topic connected to the chapter to which it is associated. The television broadcast rights for these documentaries was secured by the History Channel.

From Volume One, The Early Years

My First Adventure Special Features (Vol. 1 Disc 1)
 Archaeology - Unearthing Our Past
 Howard Carter and the Tomb of Tutankhamun
 Colonel Lawrence's War - T.E. Lawrence and Arabia
 From Slavery to Freedom

Passion for Life Special Features (Vol. 1 Disc 3)
 Theodore Roosevelt and The American Century
 Ecology - Pulse of the Planet
 American Dreams - Norman Rockwell and the Saturday Evening Post
 Art Rebellion - The Making of the Modern
 Edgar Degas - Reluctant Rebel
 Braque & Picasso - A Collaboration Cubed

The Perils of Cupid Special Features (Vol. 1 Disc 5)
 The Archduke's Last Journey - End of an Era
 Carl Jung and the Journey to Self Discovery
 Giacomo Puccini - Music of the Heart
 Sigmund Freud - Exploring the Unconscious
 It's Opera!
 Powder Keg - Europe 1900 to 1914
 Psychology - Charting the Human Mind

Travels with Father Special Features (Vol. 1 Disc 6)
 Seeking Truth - The Life of Leo Tolstoy
 Unquiet Voices - Russian Writers and the State
 Aristotle - Creating Foundations
 Ancient Questions - Philosophy and Our Search for Meaning

Journey of Radiance Special Features (Vol. 1 Disc 7)
 Jiddu Krishnamurti - The Reluctant Messiah
 Annie Besant - An Unlikely Rebel
 Medicine in the Middle Kingdom
 Eastern Spirituality - The Road to Enlightenment

Spring Break Adventure Special Features (Vol. 1 Disc 9)
 Thomas Edison - Lighting Up the World
 Invention and Innovation - What's Behind a Good Idea?
 The Mystery of Edward Stratemeyer
 Wanted: Dead or Alive - Pancho Villa and the American Invasion of Mexico
 General John J. Pershing and His American Army
 George S. Patton - American Achilles

Love's Sweet Song Special Features (Vol 1. Disc 11)
 Easter Rising - The Poets' Rebellion
 The Passions of William Butler Yeats
 Sean O'Casey vs. Ireland
 Ireland - The Power of the Poets
 Winston Churchill - The Lion's Roar
 Demanding the Vote - The Pankhursts and British Suffrage
 Fighting for the Vote - Women's Suffrage in America

From Volume Two, The War Years

Trenches of Hell Special Features (Vol 2. Disc 1)
 Siegfried Sassoon - A War Poet's Journey
 Robert Graves and the White Goddess
 I Am France - The Myth of Charles de Gaulle
 The Somme - A Storm of Steel

Demons of Deception Special Features (Vol 2. Disc 2)
 Marshal Pétain's Fall from Grace
 Flirting with Danger - The Fantasy of Mata Hari
 Into the Furnace - The Battle of Verdun
 Reading the Enemy's Mind - Espionage in World War I

Phantom Train of Doom Special Features (Vol 2. Disc 3)
 Chasing the Phantom - Paul von Lettow-Vorbeck
 Dreaming of Africa - The Life of Frederick Selous
 At Home and Abroad - The Two Faces of Jan Smuts

Oganga, The Giver and Taker of Life Special Features (Vol 2. Disc 4)
 Albert Schweitzer - Reverence for Life
 Waging Peace - The Rise of Pacifism
 Congo - A Curse of Riches

Attack of the Hawkmen Special Features (Vol 2. Disc 5)
 War in the Third Dimension - Aerial Warfare in World War I
 Blood Red - The Life and Death of Manfred von Richthofen
 Flying High for France - The Lafayette Escadrille
 Anthony Fokker - The Flying Dutchman

Adventures in the Secret Service Special Features (Vol 2. Disc 6)
 Karl - The Last Habsburg Emperor
 The Russian Revolution - All Power to the Soviets!
 V.I. Lenin - History Will Not Forgive Us

Espionage Escapades Special Features (Vol 2. Disc 7)
 Impresario - Sergei Diaghilev and the Ballets Russes
 Ballet - The Art of Dance
 Franz Kafka's Dark Truth

Daredevils of the Desert Special Features (Vol 2. Disc 8)
 Lines in the Sand - The Middle East and the Great War
 Col. Lawrence's War - T.E. Lawrence and Arabia (note: repeated from Vol 1. Disc 1)

From Volume Three, The Years of Change

Tales of Innocence (Vol. 3 Disc 1)
 Unhealed Wounds - The Life of Ernest Hemingway
 The Secret Life of Edith Wharton
 Lowell Thomas - American Storyteller
 The French Foreign Legion - The World's Most Legendary Fighting Force

Masks of Evil (Vol. 3 Disc 2)
  For the People, Despite the People - The Atatürk Revolution
 The Greedy Heart of Halide Edib
 Dracula - Fact and Fiction
 The Ottoman Empire - A World of Difference

Treasure of the Peacock's Eye (Vol. 3 Disc 3)
 Bronisław Malinowski - God Professor
 Anthropology - Looking at the Human Condition
 New Guinea - Paradise in Peril

Winds of Change (Vol. 3 Disc 5)
 Woodrow Wilson - American Idealist
 Gertrude Bell - Iraq's Uncrowned Queen
 Ho Chi Minh - The Price of Freedom
 Paul Robeson - Scandalize My Name
 Robert Goddard - Mr. Rocket Science
 The Best Intentions - The Paris Peace Conference and the Treaty of Versailles

Mystery of the Blues (Vol. 3 Disc 7)
 Al "Scarface" Capone - The Original Gangster
 Ben Hecht - Shakespeare of Hollywood
 On the Trail of Eliot Ness
 Louis Armstrong - Ambassador of Jazz
 Jazz - Rhythms of Freedom
 Prohibition - America on the Rocks
 Hellfighters - Harlem's Heroes of World War I

The Scandal of 1920 (Vol. 3 Disc 8)
 Tin Pan Alley - Soundtrack of America
 Broadway - America Center Stage
 Wonderful Nonsense - The Algonquin Round Table

Hollywood Follies (Vol. 3 Disc 9)
 Erich von Stroheim - The Profligate Genius
 The World of John Ford
 Irving Thalberg - Hollywood's Boy Wonder
 The Rise of the Moguls - The Men Who Built Hollywood

Historical overview lectures
 Vol. 1 - Historical Lecture: "The Promise of Progress"
 Vol. 2 - Historical Lecture: "War and Revolution"
 Vol. 3 - Historical Lecture: "New Gods for Old"[37]

Content here was copied from http://indianajones.wikia.com/wiki/List_of_The_Adventures_of_Young_Indiana_Jones_DVD_additional_features which has a compatible CC-BY-SA-3.0 license

Reception
The series was nominated for 18 Emmy Awards and won 6. In 1993, Corey Carrier was nominated for the Young Artist Award in the category of "Best Young Actor Starring in a Television Series". In 1994, David Tattersall was nominated for the ASC Award in the category of "Outstanding Achievement in Cinematography in Regular Series". At the 1994 Golden Globes, the series was nominated for "Best TV-Series — Drama".

Though the series won many awards, it also received some criticism. The New York Times called the pilot "clunky" for example.

Marketing
Four volumes of music from the series were released on CD. The show also spawned a series of adaptations and spin-off novels, a NES game The Young Indiana Jones Chronicles developed and published by Jaleco, a Sega Mega Drive game Instruments of Chaos starring Young Indiana Jones, trading cards and other products.

References

Further reading
 Champlin, Charles. George Lucas: The Creative Impulse (Harry N. Abrams, 1997).
 Madsen, Dan. The Young Indiana Jones Chronicles: On the Set and Behind the Scenes (Doubleday Books for Young Readers, 1992).

External links
 
 Chronological episode guide
 TheRaider.net - The Young Indiana Jones Chronicles, extensive coverage
 Adventures in Learning with Indiana Jones - A fan site that details the educational aspects of the series.
 On the Trail of Young Indy - A fan site that records filming locations seen in the series.

 
1992 American television series debuts
1996 American television series endings
1990s American children's television series
American Broadcasting Company original programming
American children's adventure television series
American children's education television series
American prequel television series
World War I television drama series
English-language television shows
Television series produced at Pinewood Studios
Television series by Lucasfilm
Television series by CBS Studios
Television series by Amblin Entertainment
Television series set in the 20th century
Television series set in the 1900s
Television series set in the 1910s
Television shows adapted into comics
Television shows adapted into novels
Television shows adapted into video games 
Television shows filmed in North Carolina
Television shows filmed in Wilmington, North Carolina
Live action television shows based on films
Adventure television series
Cultural depictions of Winston Churchill
Cultural depictions of Georges Clemenceau
Cultural depictions of Edgar Degas
Cultural depictions of Archduke Franz Ferdinand of Austria
Cultural depictions of David Lloyd George
Cultural depictions of T. E. Lawrence
Cultural depictions of Pablo Picasso
Cultural depictions of Albert Schweitzer
Cultural depictions of Woodrow Wilson
Cultural depictions of Pancho Villa
Primetime Emmy Award-winning television series